The 2010 Mexican Figure Skating Championships took place between 16 and 22 November 2009 in Metepec. Skaters competed in the disciplines of men's singles and ladies' singles on the senior level. The results were used to choose the Mexican teams to the 2010 World Championships and the 2010 Four Continents Championships.

Senior results

Men

Ladies

External links
 results

Mexican Figure Skating Championships, 2010
2009 in figure skating
Mexico Figure Skating Championships, 2010
Fig
Mexican Figure Skating Championships